Stanley Mitton Holden (25 January 1886 — 10 May 1971) was an English cricketer who played first-class cricket for Derbyshire in 1910 and 1920.

Holden was born in Chesterfield, Derbyshire. He made his debut for Derbyshire in the 1910 season in August in a match against Essex. In that and the next match he had little opportunity to bowl and batted at the tail end. His third match that season was a wash-out. Holden next played for Derbyshire after the First World War in a single game in the 1920 season against Somerset. He took three wickets in that match and again batted at the tail end. Holden was a left-arm medium-fast bowler and took three wickets in his first-class career at an average of 37.00. He was a right-handed batsman and played 6 innings in 4 matches with a top score of 6 not out and an average of 3.25.
 
Holden died in Coventry at the age of 85.

References

1886 births
1971 deaths
English cricketers
Derbyshire cricketers